The Ober-Stallmeister (from) was a post (rank) in the Tsardom of Russia and the Russian Empire, from 4 February 1722 – a court rank of the 3rd class in the Table of Ranks (in 1766 it was moved to the 2nd class of the table).

Like other court officials, abolished after the February Revolution – from 17 March 1917, in connection with the liquidation of the institution of imperial power.

See also
Stallmeister

References

Court Ranks of the Russian Empire